Lara Secondary College is a public co-educational secondary school located in Lara, Australia, which shares fences with a local primary school Lara Primary School. Lara secondary college accommodates approximately 900 students from years 7–12. The school officially opened, taking just year 7 students, on the current site in 2003. As of 2008 Lara Secondary College was a complete secondary school having grades from year 7 to 12 attending.

At the beginning of the 2012 school year, all of the renovations had been completed and a new more modernistic building had been built for the year 7 and 8 students.

House colours
Lara Secondary College has four house teams composed of year 7 to 12's:

Hovell (Red) 
Flinders (Purple) 
You Yangs (Green) 
Serendip (Yellow)

References

External links
College Website

Secondary schools in Victoria (Australia)
Educational institutions established in 2003
2003 establishments in Australia
City of Greater Geelong